Most countries of the world have different names in different languages. Some countries have also undergone name changes for political or other reasons. 
Countries are listed alphabetically by their most common name in English. Each English name is followed by its most common equivalents in other languages, listed in English alphabetical order (ignoring accents) by name and by language. Historical and/or alternative versions, where included, are noted as such. Foreign names that are the same as their English equivalents are also listed. See also: List of alternative country names

Please format entries as follows: for languages written in the Latin alphabet, write "Name (language)", for example, " (Portuguese)", and add it to the list according to English rules of alphabetical order. For languages written in other writing systems, write "Romanization - native script (language)", for example " -  (Yiddish)", and alphabetize it in the list by the Romanized form.

Due to its size, this list has been split into four parts:
List of country names in various languages (A–C)
List of country names in various languages (D–I)
List of country names in various languages (J–P)
List of country names in various languages (Q–Z)

See also
 List of countries and dependencies and their capitals in native languages
 List of sovereign states
 List of Latin place names in Europe
 Names of European cities in different languages
 List of European regions with alternative names
 List of European rivers with alternative names
 Names of Asian cities in different languages
 Geographical renaming
 Endonym (internal name) and Exonym (external name) of a geographical place

External links
Slovene Governmental Commission for the Standardisation of Geographical Names - in the first column are names as proposed by the commission, in the second column are short official names, in the third column are long official names. Accessed on 7 October 2005.
GEONAMES - Countries of the World - The countries of the world in their own languages and scripts, with official names, capitals, flags, coats of arms, administrative divisions, national anthems, and translations of the countries and capitals into many languages.
CLDR - Unicode Common Locale Data Repository - provides developer-friendly XML files with a lot of language/locale specific data, including country names in over 50 different languages. Download the latest data file, core.zip file, find file common/main/[language code].xml, and ldml/localeDisplayNames/territories/territory tags from it

Lists of country names in various languages